José Antonio Sánchez is a paralympic athlete from Spain competing mainly in category T11 800m events.

Biography
Antonio competed in three Paralympics, winning a total of seven medals including four golds.  His first games were his home games in 1992 in Barcelona where he won a bronze medal in the 1500m; a silver in the 800m in which Poland's Waldemar Kikolsji broke the games record; the 400m winning a second silver; and the 4 × 400 m relay, winning a gold as part of the world record breaking Spanish team. He competed in three events in Atlanta in 1996 where he was undefeated, winning  gold medals as part of the Spanish 4 × 400 m relay team, in the 1500m and leading a Spanish 1,2,3 in the 800m.  Unfortunately he only competed in the 400m at the 2000 Summer Paralympics and finished fourth in his heat and failed to make the final.

See also
 Jose Sanchez

References

Paralympic athletes of Spain
Athletes (track and field) at the 1992 Summer Paralympics
Athletes (track and field) at the 1996 Summer Paralympics
Athletes (track and field) at the 2000 Summer Paralympics
Paralympic gold medalists for Spain
Paralympic silver medalists for Spain
Paralympic bronze medalists for Spain
Living people
Medalists at the 1992 Summer Paralympics
Medalists at the 1996 Summer Paralympics
Year of birth missing (living people)
Paralympic medalists in athletics (track and field)
Spanish male middle-distance runners
Visually impaired middle-distance runners
Paralympic middle-distance runners
20th-century Spanish people